Globophobia may refer to:
Fear or dislike of globalization
 Balloon phobia